Landro Church is a parish church of the Church of Norway in Øygarden Municipality in Vestland county, Norway. It is located in the village of Landro. It is one of the three churches for the Fjell parish which is part of the Vesthordland prosti (deanery) in the Diocese of Bjørgvin. The white, concrete church was built in a rectangular design in 1977 using plans drawn up by the architect Aksel Fronth. The church seats about 400 people.

History
In 1906, the village of Landro got a small prayer house. In 1923, the prayer house was consecrated for church use as an annex chapel. In 1974, the parish to build a church in Landro to replace the small chapel. Aksel Fronth was hired to design the new church. He designed a square building with a roof like a pyramid. The new church was consecrated on 11 December 1977.

See also
List of churches in Bjørgvin

References

Øygarden
Churches in Vestland
Rectangular churches in Norway
Concrete churches in Norway
20th-century Church of Norway church buildings
Churches completed in 1977
1977 establishments in Norway